Karel Kubeška (born 17 June 1955) is a Czech curler and curling coach.

He was a vice-president of European Curling Federation in 2010-2014.

Personal life 
Karel Kubeška is a father of Anna Kubešková, one of the best Czech women curlers. Karel has coached Anna's team for a long time and played with her in mixed curling teams. He is married, has two children and works as a marketing advisor.

References

External links

Living people
1955 births
Sportspeople from Prague
Czech male curlers
Czech curling coaches